Women Wage Peace is an Israeli grassroots peace movement, formed shortly after the Gaza War in 2014. Its primary goal is to pressure the Israeli government into achieving a "bilaterally acceptable political agreement" to end the Israeli-Palestinian conflict, with a target date of 2018.

Origin 
While originally started by Israeli women, the movement has worked to build connections with Palestinian women, also reaching out to both women and men of many other local regions and religious backgrounds. It was inspired by similar women's movements in Northern Ireland and Liberia, where women of different faiths had united to help resolve violent conflicts. Inspiration also came from the Four Mothers movement, established in 1997, which ultimately influenced Israel's military withdrawal from South Lebanon. 

The movement has its basis on two main objectives:
 To encourage peace negotiations between Israel and the Palestinian Authority
 To urge the enforcement of UN resolution 1325 which "reaffirms the important role of women in the prevention and resolution of conflicts"

Membership 
As of May 2017, Women Wage Peace had more than 20,000 members and supporters.

Activities

2015 Israel General Election 
In March 2015, members of the movement protested outside the Israel Parliament building in Jerusalem, calling for politicians to put more priority on peace talks in the general election debates.

2015 Operation Protective Fast
In 2015, from July 8 to August 26, Women Wage Peace staged a collective fast outside Israeli Prime Minister Benjamin Netanyahu's formal residence, timing their symbolic 50-day "Operation Protective Fast" to coincide with the anniversary of Operation Protective Edge in Gaza the previous year. Approximately 300 women and men participated, joining the protest in shifts. In early September, a week after the hunger strike had concluded, four members of the movement were invited to a formal meeting with Netanyahu to discuss the possibility of renewing peace talks with Palestine.

2016 March for Peace
In October 2016, over 3000 Israeli and Palestinian women participated in a Women Wage Peace march from Northern Israel to Jerusalem, ending with a rally in front of Prime Minister Netanyahu's formal residence. Among the speakers at the rally was Leymah Gbowee, a Liberian peace activist and Nobel Peace Prize laureate known for helping to end the Second Liberian Civil War.

Following the march, Canadian-Israeli singer and activist Yael Deckelbaum of Habanot Nechama collaborated with Women Wage Peace to create the song "Prayer of the Mothers", which included clips of a speech by Gbowee. As of May 2017, the music video had received over 3 million views on YouTube.

2017 activities
The movement has continued to remain active, building pressure and awareness around the need for peaceful conflict resolution.

In March 2017, at an International Women's Day reception in Tel Aviv, more than a dozen foreign female ambassadors pledged their support for the Women Wage Peace movement.

On May 13, 2017, the Israeli music network Constant Culture announced that they had created an EDM compilation album in support of peace, with all proceeds going to Women Wage Peace.

On May 18, 2017, members of Women Wage Peace met in Tel Aviv in advance of U.S. President Donald Trump's first visit to Israel, creating a human chain that spelled out "ready for peace".

References

External links
 

Peace organizations based in Israel
Non-governmental organizations involved in the Israeli–Palestinian peace process